It's in the Air (aka Chiseling Chiselers', In the Bag' and Let Freedom Ring) is a 1935 American comedy film directed by Charles Reisner and written by Byron Morgan and Lew Lipton. The film stars Jack Benny in his final film for MGM, Ted Healy, Una Merkel, Nat Pendleton, Mary Carlisle and Grant Mitchell. It's in the Air was released on October 11, 1935, by Metro-Goldwyn-Mayer.

Plot
Con men Calvin Churchill (Jack Benny) and "Clip" McGurk (Ted Healy),  in the business of fixing races, boxing matches and other sporting events, are forced to go on the run when Henry Potke (Nat Pendleton), special investigator from the Revenue Department, is after them for tax evasion. Potke tracks the con men to a hotel room, where they trick him by claiming they are suffering from a highly infectious influenza. Potke flees in terror.

In a hurry to skip town, Calvin tells Clip to go to Desert Springs, California, to see his wife Alice (Una Merkel), who is a tennis instructor at a resort. Calvin meets W. R. Gridley (Grant Mitchell), a devious schemer who uses his lovely daughter Grace (Mary Carlisle) to convince Calvin to buy an air balloon. Calvin thinks that Gridley is the sucker, however, and negotiates a free aircraft ride to find the perfect location for a stratospheric flight in his new balloon. Calvin introduces Clip as one of the most daring balloonists in America. Clip, however, is afraid of heights.

Alice tells Calvin that she will not return to him until he quits his devious schemes but no sooner does he comply, than she witnesses him fleecing some hotel guests to pay for his room. When Calvin's photo appears in a newspaper, Potke heads off to the resort.

After leaving $85,000 in cash with Alice, Calvin tries to find Clip, who is in hiding, afraid to be forced to fly in the balloon. At the launch; the two hucksters finally arrive, and soar off into space. They make radio contact at a record 73,900 feet and after they broadcast their promoters' advertisements, Calvin and Clip find themselves in trouble when the balloon falls apart.

Forced to parachute to safety, Calvin tells reporters about his desire to be reunited with his wife. Potke arrives to announce that the charges for delinquent tax payments have been dropped, and Calvin and Alice reunite for good.

Cast

Jack Benny as Calvin Churchill
Ted Healy as "Clip" McGurk
Una Merkel as Alice Lane Churchill
Nat Pendleton as Henry Potke
Mary Carlisle as Grace Gridley
Grant Mitchell as W. R. Gridley
Harvey Stephens as Sidney Kendall
Charles Trowbridge as Alfred Drake
Johnny Arthur as Jones
Al Shean as Mr. Johnson
Purnell Pratt as Horace McNab 
Phillips Smalley as Mr. Winterby
Howard Hickman as Mr. Ruby
Larry Wheat as Tubbs
Richard Kipling as Mr. Platt 
Jim Toney as Curly
Maude Allen as Mrs. Smith Burlington
George Chandler

Production
Principal photography on It's in the Air took place from mid-July to August 17, 1935. The film, followed Lost in the Stratosphere (1935) as one of the few 1930s aviation films that focused on high altitude balloons.

Reception
Frank Nugent, writing for The New York Times, called It's in the Air, an "... engaging a bit of nonsense", He further described, "Metro's new comedy team proves its superiority over the material placed at its disposal. The dialogue may read like a radio continuity, and most of the situations admittedly are as old as the "Cheating Cheaters" theme, but you probably won't be aware of that when Mr. Benny and Mr. Healy surge into action. When they take off in their balloon with the Revenue Bureau's Nat Pendleton as a supercargo and with Stratosphere Healy clutching a bottle of smelling salts—even a professional scowler is apt to find himself chuckling as heartily as the benighted little man who always used to read the subtitles aloud. If Metro regarded this Benny-Healy union as an experiment, let it be informed now that it was a success."

Aviation film historian James H. Farmer in Celluloid Wings: The Impact of Movies on Aviation (1984) considered It’s in the Air, (simply) "A hilarious comedy."

References

Notes

Citations

Bibliography

 Farmer, James H. Celluloid Wings: The Impact of Movies on Aviation (1st ed.). Blue Ridge Summit, Pennsylvania: TAB Books 1984. .
 Pendo, Stephen. Aviation in the Cinema. Lanham, Maryland: Scarecrow Press, 1985. .
 Sterling, Christopher H. Encyclopedia of Radio. New York: Routledge, 2003. .

External links 
 
 
 

1935 films
American aviation films
American comedy films
1935 comedy films
Metro-Goldwyn-Mayer films
Films directed by Charles Reisner
American black-and-white films
1930s English-language films
1930s American films